Batista Adélino Mendy (born 12 January 2000) is a French professional footballer who plays as a defender for Angers.

Club career
Coming out of Nantes Academy, Mendy made his professional debut for FC Nantes on 13 September 2020.

He moved to Angers SCO in July 2021 for an undisclosed fee on a three-year contract.

International career
Born in France, Mendy is of Bissau-Guinean descent. He is a youth international for France.

References

External links

2000 births
Living people
Sportspeople from Saint-Nazaire
Footballers from Loire-Atlantique
French footballers
France youth international footballers
Association football defenders
FC Nantes players
Angers SCO players
Ligue 1 players
Championnat National 2 players
Championnat National 3 players
Black French sportspeople
French people of Bissau-Guinean descent